Aslan's Country is a fictional location from C. S. Lewis' The Chronicles of Narnia series. It is the home of Aslan, the great lion. It is described as a series of mountains, tens of thousands of feet high, but without snow or ice. Instead, Aslan's Country has a clear blue sky, lush green grass, colourful birds, and beautiful trees. There are entrances to Aslan's Country from all worlds, including Narnia and Earth. It is located beyond Narnia's rising sun at the eastern edge of the world, and indeed rings around the whole Narnian world.

References in the books

The Voyage of the Dawn Treader
In The Voyage of the Dawn Treader, the third published book of the series, King Caspian X of Narnia sets out to the eastern edge of the world to find the fate of the seven lost lords of Narnia. At the end of the voyage, Reepicheep, a talking mouse, goes directly to Aslan's Country. (VDT Ch. 16)

The Silver Chair
At the beginning of The Silver Chair, Eustace Scrubb and Jill Pole escape from bullies at a boarding school in England and find themselves in Aslan's Country, where they meet Aslan. They are then blown to Narnia by Aslan's breath. At the end of the adventure they find themselves back in Aslan's Country. There they witness the resurrection of King Caspian and, after Aslan promises them that they will one day return to stay, they are sent back to England. (SC   Ch. 1,16)

The Last Battle
At the end of The Last Battle, there is a stable door that leads to Aslan's country. Initially, it only led to a stable used by Shift and the Calormenes as a means to control Narnians by claiming it to hold the false god "Tashlan". But after the final battle before Narnia's end, the stable door becomes a site of final judgment for all Narnians, living and dead. This could be due to the country Narnia being conquered by an external force for a third time. Narnia was first invaded by the White Witch from the Wild Lands of the North in 898, then by Caspian The Conqurer from Telmar in 1998, and then by an unknown Tisroc from Calormene in 2555. For those who have faith in Aslan—including the deceased Pevensie children (excluding Susan), Eustace Scrubb, Jill Pole, Digory Kirke and Polly Plummer—the door leads to Aslan's country. However, Narnians who abandoned their belief in Aslan and acted in evil are sent to an unmentioned place whose identity even the author claims not to know. However, some believe that Aslan himself changed their beliefs to make room in his country and are instead sent to the antithesis of Aslan's Country, most likely Tash's Country. The animals in that category lose their ability to speak. Once the final judgment is complete, Narnia's end comes full circle when the country is then reduced to a tundra wasteland after its plant life is eaten away by the Dragons and Salamanders, the Sun is crushed by Father Time, and the land flooded while the heavens are undone.

From there, Aslan's country is explained to be where the "Real Narnia" begins, identical to the old one yet without any imperfections. It is also discovered that England and all other countries and worlds are promontories of the Great Mountains of Aslan's Country. All worlds in Creation have their perfect nature in Aslan's Country.  So, it is also home to creatures from other worlds who came to live there after their death or the end of their world.

Commentary
Because, as Lewis wrote, "He [Aslan] is an invention giving an imaginary answer to the question, 'What might Christ become like, if there really were a world like Narnia and He chose to be incarnate and die and rise again in that world as He actually has done in ours?'"  it is natural to associate Aslan's Country with the Christian heaven.  It is where Narnians who love Aslan go at death  and where all Narnians who "looked in the face of Aslan and loved him" arrive at the end of the world . The representation of Heaven as a mountain is Biblical: "Who shall ascend the mountain of the Lord?"

Aslan's Country also represents Plato's World of Ideas, of which the physical world and the ideas in our minds are alike copies. In The Last Battle it is explained that all worlds, including the Narnia world and our own, are spurs from Aslan's Mountain, and Professor Kirke comments "All in Plato, all in Plato".

Film adaptation
In the 2010 film The Chronicles of Narnia: The Voyage of the Dawn Treader, the film involves a seafaring quest by King Caspian to find the country. At the end of the film, Reepicheep is shown the way to Aslan's country.

References

See also

Fictional elements introduced in 1952
The Chronicles of Narnia countries
Heaven in popular culture